Harry Donl Peterson (February 17, 1930 – March 21, 1994) was a religion professor at Brigham Young University (BYU) who primarily studied topics related to the Book of Mormon and Pearl of Great Price.

Biography
Peterson was born and raised in Lehi, Utah.  He served a mission in the Western States Mission (headquartered in Denver, Colorado).  Peterson received his bachelor's and master's degrees from BYU.  He also had a doctorate in education from Washington State University.  Starting in 1964 he was a professor at BYU.  Prior to that he worked as a seminary and institute teacher and administrator with the Church Educational System.  At BYU he directed several travel study programs as well as being involved with the Know Your Religion program.

In the Church of Jesus Christ of Latter-day Saints (LDS Church), Peterson served three times as a bishop and was also president of the BYU 15th Stake.  He served in the original branch presidency of the Jerusalem Branch.

Peterson married Mary Lou Schenk in the Salt Lake Temple in 1953.  They had six children.

At the age of 64, Peterson died of cancer at his home in Orem, Utah, and was buried in the Orem City Cemetery.

Publications
In addition to his own attributed publications, Peterson also served on LDS Church writing committees that prepared four manuals for the church's Gospel Doctrine classes.

  Later published by Deseret Book in 2000, and Cedar Fort in 2007.

  Later published by Cedar Fort in 2008.

Notes

Sources
Cedar Fort biography of Peterson
Biography accompanying his collection of materials related to the Book of Abraham at the L. Tom Perry Special Collections

External links 
 H. Donl Peterson Research Collection on the Book of Abraham Papri at BYU
 
Library Thing listing for Peterson

1930 births
1994 deaths
20th-century Mormon missionaries
American Latter Day Saint writers
American Mormon missionaries in the United States
Brigham Young University alumni
Brigham Young University faculty
Church Educational System instructors
Historians of the Latter Day Saint movement
People from Lehi, Utah
People from Orem, Utah
Washington State University alumni
Writers from Utah
Deaths from cancer in Utah
American leaders of the Church of Jesus Christ of Latter-day Saints
20th-century  American historians
Latter Day Saints from Utah